Susan Marie Olsen (born August 14, 1961) is an American actress and former radio host. Olsen is known for her role as Cindy Brady, the youngest Brady child in the sitcom The Brady Bunch for the full run of the show, from 1969 to 1974.

Early life
Olsen was born in Santa Monica, California, to Lawrence and DeLoice Olsen, the youngest of four children. Her siblings are: Larry (23 years older), Christopher (15 years older), and Diane (5 years older). Christopher was also a child actor whose most prominent role may be in the 1956 feature film The Man Who Knew Too Much (1956).

Susan Olsen really did have a lisp. That feature was real, and Olsen worked hard to overcome the speech impediment throughout her life. Olsen's role as the youngest Brady followed her after she left the series, and she was often teased for portraying the sometimes-annoying character.  She graduated from William H. Taft High School in Woodland Hills, California in 1979.

Acting career

Early roles and The Brady Bunch 
Olsen landed a number of supporting roles in television, most notably in Ironside, Gunsmoke, and Julia, and appeared in the Elvis Presley movie The Trouble With Girls (1968) as a squeaky-clean singer in a singing contest.
At just under age eight, Olsen was cast as Cindy Brady on The Brady Bunch. As an adult, Olsen has said that portraying Cindy made friendships difficult for her as a child. She most disliked the season two "tattletale" episode, in which Cindy incessantly tattles on her siblings. Because of the episode, she was shunned by real-life peers, who did not understand the difference between actors and their characters. Olsen has appeared in all Brady Bunch reunion movies with the exception of A Very Brady Christmas (1988), which was filmed when she and her first husband Steve Ventimiglia were on their honeymoon. In that movie, Cindy Brady was played by actress Jennifer Runyon. Olsen reprised her role as Cindy Brady in the short-lived CBS spin-off series The Bradys.

In 2005, VH1 ranked her No. 34 in The 100 Greatest Kid Stars of television and film. In 2007, Olsen and her fellow cast members were honored with the TV Pop Culture Award on the TV Land Awards, one of the few awards The Brady Bunch has ever won.

As a teen, Olsen was the spokesgirl for Sindy doll, made by Marx Toys from the mid-1970s. As an adult, Olsen moved into the graphic design business and in 1998 briefly marketed a brand of glow-in-the-dark shoes for Converse.  She also worked as a talk show host at the Los Angeles radio station KLSX from 1995 to 1996 with Ken Ober, and co-hosted and co-wrote another radio show with comedian Allan Havey at Comedy World in 2000.

After The Brady Bunch 
She appeared in episode 26 of Cartoon Network's talk show Space Ghost Coast to Coast,  "Switcheroo", with Cassandra Peterson as "Elvira, Mistress of the Dark". Olsen has also been an advocate for migraine sufferers since 1998. She described her headaches on Larry King Live.

An urban legend claimed that Olsen had become an adult film star. In a late 1990s television interview, Olsen stated that her "porn" connection was that she created space ship sound effects for a porn film called Love Probe from a Warm Planet. 

In the fall of 2008, Olsen appeared on Fox Reality's Gimme My Reality Show, in which celebrities compete to win their own reality show. She used this vehicle to make a statement about animal rescue, a cause with which she is thoroughly involved. On June 6, 2009, Olsen thanked retired game show host and animal rights activist Bob Barker when The Bradys accepted an honor at the GSN Awards. An animal welfare advocate, she has served on the board of directors of the nonprofit organization Precious Paws, a rescue group.

On September 1, 2009, Olsen released the coffee table book Love to Love You Bradys: The Bizarre Story of The Brady Bunch Variety Hour that celebrates the 1976–77 television variety show The Brady Bunch Hour. 

In September 2010, Olsen made a guest appearance on The Young and the Restless playing Mrs. Liza Morton, the owner of a preschool. In 2011, she appeared in season 3, episode 43 of The Biography Channel's reality show Celebrity Ghost Stories. 

In July 2012, Olsen was one of a limited number of artists and celebrities invited to show their work in Art with an Agenda: An Exhibit Inspired by Kelly Thomas at the PAS Gallery in Fullerton, California. inspired by the life and circumstances surrounding the death of Kelly Thomas, a homeless, schizophrenic, 37-year-old man who was beaten by members of the Fullerton Police Department on July 5, 2011. Olsen's piece, "Still Life," showed a half-eaten donut in a puddle of blood beside a lit flashlight.

In December 2016, Olsen was fired from her radio show, "Two Chicks Talkin' Politics" on LA Talk Radio, after engaging in a feud with openly gay actor Leon Acord-Whiting. Responding to comments Acord-Whiting had made about her on another station, Olsen unleashed a profane rant against him, accusing him of cowardice. Acord-Whiting accused Olsen of homophobia for the remarks (which included repeated use of the word "faggot") and successfully lobbied to have Olsen fired.
Olsen told Fox News in 2019 that she has "been the subject of fake news" and "never got fired."

Olsen joined with the other surviving main cast members of The Brady Bunch in the 2019 television series A Very Brady Renovation on HGTV. In 2021, she starred in the Lifetime Christmas movie, Blending Christmas, alongside her Brady Bunch co-stars Christopher Knight, Mike Lookinland, Barry Williams, and Robbie Rist.

Filmography

Film

Television

References

External links

 Official website 
 
  

1961 births
Living people
Actresses from Santa Monica, California
American child actresses
American radio personalities
American television actresses
American voice actresses
William Howard Taft Charter High School alumni
20th-century American actresses
21st-century American actresses